Mario Primicerio (born 13 November 1940 in Rome) is an Italian politician and the former Mayor of Florence.

Career
Graduating with a degree in physics from the University of Florence, in 1970 Primicerio started teaching at the university after working as a researcher at the ionized gas laboratory in Frascati. During these years he became a close collaborator of the former Mayor of Florence Giorgio La Pira.

In 1995, Primicerio ran for the office of Mayor himself on an independent center-left platform, which was supported by the former communist Democratic Party of the Left and various other progressive parties, such as the new-born Federation of the Greens and the Communist Refoundation Party. The main opposition to Primicerio's coalition came from Giorgio Morales, the outgoing mayor, former member of the Italian Socialist Party and now a supporter of Silvio Berlusconi's Forza Italia party.

Primicerio won the election on the first round and became the first elected Mayor, remaining in office until he retired from politics in 1999.

He has since been appointed a visiting professor at several universities, in places such as Austin, Beijing, Helsinki, Minneapolis, Novosibirsk, Oxford, Paris, Rosario, São Carlos and Tel Aviv.

References

External links
 Home Page on "Ulisse Dini" Department of Mathematics and Computer Science of University of Florence

1940 births
Living people
Mayors of Florence
Politicians from Rome